Yorke Allen Jr. (28 April 1915 – 6 April 1989) was a member of the Connecticut House of Representatives from the 143rd district from 1979 to 1983. He previously served on the New Canaan Town Council from 1970 to 1978. He was an associate of Rockefeller Brothers Fund.

He graduated from Princeton University in 1936. He was President of the Board of Trustees of Lingnan University of Canton, China.

He died on 6 April 1989 at Norwalk Hospital in Norwalk, Connecticut.

References 

1915 births
1989 deaths
American investment bankers
Connecticut city council members
Members of the Connecticut House of Representatives
Princeton University alumni
People from New Canaan, Connecticut
20th-century American politicians